Doboz is a village in Békés County, in the Southern Great Plain region of south-east Hungary.

Geography
It covers an area of 54.47 km² and has a population of 4084 people (2015).

Notable people
Mihály Mező (born 1978), singer and musician, was raised here

References

External links

  in Hungarian

Populated places in Békés County